Feeling Free may refer to:

 Feeling Free (Barney Kessell album)
 Feeling Free (Sydney Youngblood album)